Liqueur Fogg is a Brazilian cocoa-flavoured liqueur, manufactured in Gramado, Rio Grande do Sul. It has used substantially the same recipe since its inception in 1930.

References

External links
Manufacturer's Website (Portuguese only)

Chocolate liqueurs
Alcoholic drink brands